Mark Leslie may refer to:
 Mark Leslie (author) (born 1969), Canadian author
 Mark Leslie (entrepreneur) (born 1945), American entrepreneur
 Mark Leslie (footballer) (born 1978), Belizean footballer